Santo Domingo is the top female volleyball team of Santo Domingo.

History
The team was founded in 2007.

Current volleyball squad
As of December 2008

Coach:  Enrique Larrazaleta

Assistant coach:  Juan Capellan

Palmares

National competition 
National league

None

References
League Official website

Dominican Republic volleyball clubs
Volleyball clubs established in 2007